The Remington Spartan 453, also known as the SPR 453, is a gas operated semi-automatic shotgun.  It is an American import of the Russian-made Baikal MP-153, manufactured by Izhevsk Mechanical Plant in Izhevsk, Russia. It was marketed and distributed by Remington Arms, who ceased importing the shotgun to the United States in 2008.

The SPR 453 is inexpensive compared to other semi-automatic shotguns. It is most often used for hunting birds, and for clay pigeon shooting sports, such as trap and skeet. Several versions of the SPR 453 were marketed, including one using Mossy Oak "New Break-Up" camouflage.

References

External links
 Owner's Manual at Remington.com
 Remington SPR 453 via YouTube

Remington Arms firearms
Semi-automatic shotguns of Russia
Weapons and ammunition introduced in 2006